Peter Nelson McConnell (born April 19, 1960), also known as Peter Mc, is an American video game composer and musician, best known for his work at LucasArts and for composing the soundtracks for every Sly Cooper game since the second installment.

Biography
McConnell was born in Pittsburgh, Pennsylvania. Peter studied music as an undergraduate at Harvard University in the 1980s under Timothy Vincent Clarke, Curt Cacioppo and Ivan Tcherepnin. In Harvard McConnell befriended the future LucasArts composer Michael Land,  who composed many of the company's titles, and worked with him at the audio company Lexicon.  While beginning his career in the Sound Department at LucasArts, Land needed someone who would both compose and implement music into his second project Monkey Island 2: LeChuck's Revenge and McConnell stepped in. McConnell and Land co-invented iMUSE, LucasArts' patented interactive music system.

During his time at LucasArts, McConnell composed many soundtracks for games such as those in the Monkey Island, Indiana Jones and Star Wars series.  Notable titles from this time include Grim Fandango, scored with unique Mexican influenced jazz, klezmer and traditional film score style, and Full Throttle, featuring rock soundtrack which McConnell scored with rock group The Gone Jackals. While composing music for these two games, McConnell worked closely with Tim Schafer, who later hired him to compose scores for the titles Psychonauts, Brütal Legend, and Costume Quest for his company Double Fine Productions.

McConnell left LucasArts in 2000, but contributed to Escape from Monkey Island and special edition of The Secret of Monkey Island. Since then, McConnell has composed scores for Psychonauts, Sly 2: Band of Thieves, Sly 3: Honor Among Thieves (about which McConnell says that he was influenced by Henry Mancini works), and Kinectimals.

McConnell is one of the founding members of G.A.N.G., the Game Audio Network Guild.  He is also known live-action music performer, playing the electric violin.

In 2013, McConnell returned to the Sly Cooper franchise to score the fourth game, Sly Cooper: Thieves in Time, which was released in February of that year. The score of the game is performed by the Nashville Music Scoring orchestra. Also, for the first time ever, McConnell's entire score was released on iTunes to accompany the release of the game.

Recently, McConnell has worked on the Double Fine titles Broken Age and the remastered version of Grim Fandango, both of which include performances by the Melbourne Symphony Orchestra. He scored the 2021 Psychonauts 2, for which he was nominated for a BAFTA Games Award. He also wrote music for 2020 film Intersect.

He married Amy McConnell and they now have two children, Eben and Alice.

Works
Video game soundtracks

Film

Acting

Written works

References

Further reading

External links
 
 Interview at The International House of Mojo
 Artist profile at OverClocked ReMix
 "An interview with Peter McConnell" Goaste.cx: Elliott, Luke
 Interview with Peter Smith at Classical Music Journal Blog

1960 births
American male musicians
Harvard University alumni
Living people
Lucasfilm people
Video game composers
Electric violinists
Double Fine people